The Sandman: Book of Dreams (1996), edited by Ed Kramer and Neil Gaiman, is an anthology of short stories based on The Sandman comic book series.

Contents

Preface by Frank McConnell
 Masquerade and High Water by Colin Greenland
 Chain Home, Low by John M. Ford
 Stronger Than Desire by Lisa Goldstein
 Each Damp Thing by Barbara Hambly
 The Birth Day by B.W. Clough
 Splatter by Will Shetterly
 Seven Nights in Slumberland by George Alec Effinger (this features Little Nemo)
 Escape Artist by Caitlín R. Kiernan
 An Extra Smidgeon of Eternity by Robert Rodi
 The Writer's Child by Tad Williams
 Endless Sestina by Lawrence Schimel
 The Gate of Gold by Mark Kreighbaum
 A Bone Dry Place by Karen Haber
 The Witch's Heart by Delia Sherman
 The Mender of Broken Dreams by Nancy A. Collins
 Ain't You 'Most Done? by Gene Wolfe
 Valóság and Élet by Steven Brust
 Stopp't-Clock Yard by Susanna Clarke
 Afterword: Death by Tori Amos

Art
 Cover by Dave McKean
 Frontispiece by Clive Barker

1996 anthologies
American anthologies
Fantasy anthologies
Book of Dreams
HarperCollins books
Gothic comics